Pistols at Dawn may refer to:
Pistols at Dawn, a 2000 album by Cauda Pavonis
Pistols at Dawn (EP), a 2004 EP by Aqueduct
Pistols at Dawn (Consumed album)

See also
Duel